Ed Lee Gossett (January 27, 1902 – November 6, 1990) was a U.S. Representative from Texas.

Born in a sawmill camp known as Yellow Pine, near Many, Sabine Parish, Louisiana, Gossett moved to Texas in 1908 with his parents, who settled on a farm near Henrietta, Clay County and attended the rural schools of Clay and Garza Counties, Texas. He graduated from the University of Texas at Austin, A.B., 1924 and the law school of the same university, LL.B., 1927. He was admitted to the bar the latter year and commenced practice in Vernon, Texas.
He moved to Wichita Falls, Texas, in 1937 and continued the practice of law. He served as district attorney of the forty-sixth judicial district 1933-1937.

Gossett was elected as a Democrat to the Seventy-sixth and to the six succeeding Congresses and served from January 3, 1939, until his resignation on July 31, 1951. He served as chairman of the Committee on Elections No. 2 (Seventy-seventh through Seventy-ninth Congresses). According to his 1944 letterhead, he also served on the following committees as a member: Census, Territories, Insular Affairs, Revision of the Laws, and Immigration and Naturalization. He resumed the practice of law and was general attorney for the Texas Southwestern Bell Telephone Co. He served as judge of Criminal District Court, Dallas, Texas, until his death on November 6, 1990.

References

External links
 Ed Gossett speech extensively quoted in "The Electoral College Will Destroy America" by Jesse Wegman, New York Times, September 8, 2020 

1902 births
1990 deaths
Democratic Party members of the United States House of Representatives from Texas
20th-century American politicians
University of Texas School of Law alumni